Tomopleura regina is a species of sea snail, a marine gastropod mollusk in the family Borsoniidae.

Description

Distribution
This marine species occurs off Zanzibar.

References

 Thiele, 1925. Deutschen Tiefsee-Expedition auf dem Dampfer Valdivia 1898–1899

External links
 

regina
Gastropods described in 1925